State Route 18 (SR-18) is a state highway in southern Utah, running for  in Washington and Iron Counties from St. George to Beryl Junction.  It forms part of the Legacy Loop Highway from St. George to Parowan. The highway closely follows the route of the Old Spanish Trail through Dixie National Forest.

Route description

St. George to Veyo

SR-18 begins at Convention Center/Sunland Drive just south of the Bluff Street interchange with I-15 in St. George as an urban arterial and heads north through the west side of downtown St. George. After passing Sunset Boulevard (SR-8), the route has an inverted single-point urban interchange with Snow Canyon Parkway/Red Hills Parkway. The route has a dumbbell interchange at Ledges Parkway as it continues north, passing through Snow Canyon State Park. SR-18 continues northwest through Wide Canyon to Dammeron Valley and past Veyo Volcano.  It then turns north into Veyo, running through the center of the town. This segment of SR-18 (between I-15 and Veyo) is listed as part of the National Highway System.

Veyo to Beryl Junction
SR-18 leaves Veyo heading northeast to Central, then continues north and northwest through mountainous terrain in the Dixie National Forest past the Mountain Meadows Massacre site and continues into Enterprise.  It turns northeast in eastern Enterprise, then turns north through farmland outside of the town to Beryl Junction, where it ends at an intersection with SR-56.

History
The highway closely follows the route of the Old Spanish Trail through the extreme corner of southwestern Utah. This portion of the trail is known for the 1857 Mountain Meadows massacre, a controversial event in both Utah and Mormon history which occurred just off what is now SR-18.

The road from SR-1 (by 1926 US-91) at Enterprise Junction north through Enterprise to Modena was added to the state highway system in 1918. A 1927 law gave it the number and extended it west to the Nevada state line, where it became SR 25 to Panaca. In 1935, the portion from Beryl Junction west to Nevada became an extension of SR-56, which ran east from Beryl Junction to Cedar City. A branch from Enterprise west to Nevada, where SR 75 continued as a shortcut to Panaca, was added to SR-18 in 1941, but split off as SR-120 in 1945. At the southern end of the route, SR-18 was extended over US-91 in 1969 toward future I-15 (which was replacing US-91), putting the south end at SR-34, at the modern intersection of Bluff Street and St. George Blvd in St. George. A further extension to I-15 at exit 6 was made in 1974, replacing the south half of SR-34.

Major intersections

References

External links

018
Mountain Meadows Massacre
 018
 018